Christine Webster (born 1958) is a New Zealand visual artist and photographer.

Background 
Webster was born in 1958 in Pukekohe, Auckland. She currently lives in the United Kingdom.

Webster has a Diploma in Photography from Massey University and an MFA from Glasgow School of Art.

Career 
Webster is a photographer and visual artist. Her work explores society's accepted boundaries and the human psyche, specifically relating to gender and identity.

In 1991 Webster was awarded the Frances Hodgkins Fellowship.

She has received a Queen Elizabeth II Arts Council Grant (1988), Polaroid Small Projects Grant (1989).

Webster has taught at the ASA School of Art, Auckland, Unitec Institute of Technology, and Elam School of Fine Art, and currently is a senior lecturer at the Cambridge School of Art.

Her work is held in the collections of Bibliothèque nationale de France, LA County Museum of Art, George Eastman Museum, Museum Ludwig, Museum of Contemporary Art Australia, Queensland Art Gallery, Museum of New Zealand Te Papa Tongarewa, and Auckland Art Gallery Toi o Tāmaki.

Exhibitions 

 2015, Truth + Fiction, Trish Clark Gallery, Auckland (group show)
 2016, The XX Factor, Trish Clark Gallery, Auckland (group show)

References

External links 
 Official website

Living people
1958 births
People from Pukekohe
Alumni of the Glasgow School of Art
Massey University alumni
Academics of Anglia Ruskin University
New Zealand women photographers
New Zealand women artists
People associated with the Museum of New Zealand Te Papa Tongarewa